The Hangman at Home is an internationally co-produced animated film, directed by Michelle Kranot and Uri Kranot and released in 2021. Inspired by Carl Sandburg's poem of the same name, the film depicts five interwoven stories about human vulnerability and the need for emotional connection.

The film was released in both short film and immersive virtual reality editions.

The short film received a Canadian Screen Award nomination for Best Animated Short at the 10th Canadian Screen Awards in 2022.

References

External links 
 

2021 films
2021 animated films
2021 short films
Canadian animated short films
Danish animated short films
French animated short films
2020s Canadian films
2020s French films